Chromatopterum is a genus of flies in the family Chloropidae (insects commonly known as fruit flies).

Species
Chromatopterum brevicercum Liu, Nartshuk & Yang, 2017
Chromatopterum delicatum Becker, 1910
Chromatopterum dimidiatum Deeming, 1981
Chromatopterum ghanaensis Deeming, 1981
Chromatopterum linguatum Séguy, 1957
Chromatopterum longiclavatum Liu, Nartshuk & Yang, 2017: 283
Chromatopterum mirabilis Deeming, 1981
Chromatopterum nusantarum Kanmiya & Yukawa, 1985
Chromatopterum pubescens Becker, 1911
Chromatopterum suffusum Sabrosky, 1951
Chromatopterum tibiale Malloch, 1931

 Names brought to synonymy
 Chromatopterum amabile, synonym of Chloropsina amabile
 Chromatopterum ambiguum, synonym of Chloropsina ambigua
 Chromatopterum costale, synonym of Chloropsina costale
 Chromatopterum difficile, synonym of Chloropsina difficilis
 Chromatopterum elegans, synonym of Chloropsina elegans
 Chromatopterum lacreiventre, synonym of Chloropsina lacreiventris
 Chromatopterum minus, synonym of Chloropsina minus
 Chromatopterum simile, synonym of Chloropsina simile
 Chromatopterum sumatranum, synonym of Chloropsina sumatrana
 Chromatopterum triangulare, synonym of Chloropsina triangularis

References

External links 

 Chromatopterum at insectoid.info

Chloropinae
Chloropidae genera
Taxa named by Theodor Becker